Jindongornipes was a Cretaceous bird ichnogenus. Similar fossil footprints have been discovered in the Dunvegan Formation of British Columbia. These were among the first known Cretaceous fossil bird tracks in western Canada.

Footnotes

References
 McCrea, R. T. and W. A S. Sarjeant. 2001. New ichnotaxa of bird and mammal footprints from the Lower Cretaceous (Albian) Gates Formation of Alberta; pp. 453–478 in D. H. Tanke, and K. Carpenter, (eds.), Mesozoic Vertebrate Life. Indiana University Press, Bloomington and Indianapolis.

Bird trace fossils